Dorjiin Tsenddoo (Mongolian: Доржийн Цэнддоо, Dorjiin Tsenddoo; born 25 August 1954) is a Mongolian speed skater. He competed in three events at the 1980 Winter Olympics. He is also a current board member for the Mongolian Skating Association

References

External links
 

1954 births
Living people
Mongolian male speed skaters
Olympic speed skaters of Mongolia
Speed skaters at the 1980 Winter Olympics
Place of birth missing (living people)